Ansgar Knauff (born 10 January 2002) is a German footballer who plays as a right winger for Bundesliga club Eintracht Frankfurt, on loan from Borussia Dortmund.

Early life
Knauff was born in Göttingen to a German mother and Ghanaian father, but raised by his single mother.

Club career
He began his youth career at hometown club SVG Göttingen, before joining Hannover 96's youth academy in 2015. A year later, he joined the Borussia Dortmund youth team, in which he played in the 2019–20 UEFA Youth League. In September 2020, he made his debut for Borussia Dortmund II in the fourth division of German football. During the 2020–21 Regionalliga West season, he appeared in 28 games for Dortmund II, scoring 9 goals.

Borussia Dortmund
Knauff signed his first professional contract with Borussia Dortmund on 25 November 2020, lasting until 2023. He made his first team debut on 8 December, coming on as a substitute in the 83rd minute for Thorgan Hazard in the 2020–21 UEFA Champions League match against Zenit Saint Petersburg. The away match finished as a 2–1 win for Dortmund. On 20 March 2021, he made his first appearance in the Bundesliga, coming on for Thomas Meunier in the 80th minute and providing the assist for a late equalizer in a 2-2 draw against Köln. He scored his first Bundesliga goal on 10 April, scoring the winning goal in a 3–2 victory against VfB Stuttgart.

Eintracht Frankfurt
On 20 January 2022, Knauff joined Eintracht Frankfurt on an eighteen-month loan deal. Sebastian Kehl, Dortmund's head of playing department, explained the move by stating that "He approached us to state his wish to get more playing time on loan. We would like to offer him this chance to continue his development at a high level." Knauff scored his first goal for Eintracht on 5 March in a 4–1 victory against Hertha BSC. In the knockout phase of the Europa League campaign, he was an undisputed starter, did not miss a single minute of playing time, and scored important goals against FC Barcelona in the quarter-final and West Ham in the semifinal. On 18 May 2022, he appeared as a starting player in the 2022 UEFA Europa League Final against Rangers and won the Europa League trophy with his club after the penalty shoot-out. For his performance during the 2021–22 Europa League season, Knauff was awarded the Young Player of the Season award by UEFA.

Career statistics

Club

Honours 
Borussia Dortmund
DFB-Pokal: 2020–21

Eintracht Frankfurt
UEFA Europa League: 2021–22

Individual
Fritz Walter Medal U19 Silver: 2021
UEFA Europa League Young Player of the Season: 2021–22

References

External links

 
 
 
 
Ansgar Knauff at fussballdaten.de (in German)

2002 births
Living people
Sportspeople from Göttingen
Footballers from Lower Saxony
German footballers
Germany youth international footballers
Germany under-21 international footballers
German sportspeople of Ghanaian descent
Association football wingers
Borussia Dortmund II players
Borussia Dortmund players
Eintracht Frankfurt players
Bundesliga players
UEFA Europa League winning players
3. Liga players
Regionalliga players